Bonaventure-Hypolithe Sabatier (14 July 1773 – 18 October 1842) was a French officer who was promoted to the rank of General de Brigade during the Hundred Days in 1815.

Notes

References

1773 births
1842 deaths
French generals